The Sauromatian culture was an Iron Age culture of horse nomads in the area of the lower Volga River in southern Russia, dated to the 6th to 4th centuries BCE. The name of this culture originates from the Sauromatians, an ancient Scythian people mentioned by Graeco-Roman authors, and with whom it is identified.

Origins
The Sauromatian culture evolved out of elements of the Bronze Age Srubnaya culture who cooperated closely with the neighbouring Andronovo culture.

Location and identification
The Sauromatian culture was divided into two main local groups: a Lower Volga group located between the Volga River, the Don River, and the Transvolga; and a Samara-Ural group. As can be inferred from their closeness, close kin connections existed between the Lower Volga and the Samara-Ural groups.

The Lower Volga group
The section of the Lower Volga group of the Sauromatian culture located between the Don and Volga rivers corresponds to the Sauromatians, an ancient Iranic horse nomad people mentioned by Herodotus.

Political development
The Sauromatian tribe first formed during the 7th century BCE, after the Scythians had migrated westwards and become the masters of the Pontic–Caspian steppe. The historian Marek Jan Olbrycht has suggested that the Sauromatians might have been a Scythian group who migrated from Media during the period of Scythian presence in Western Asia, after which they merged with Maeotians who had a matriarchal culture. These early Sauromatians lived in the area of the Don river, near the Sea of Azov in the North Caucasus. According to the Greek historian Herodotus, the Sauromatians spoke a "corrupt form" of the Scythian language, which might be explained by the influence of the Andronovo culture in the development of the Sauromatian culture.

During the 6th to 5th centuries BCE, the Sauromatians were constituted of either a number of tribes or of a single tribe sharing a common ethnic identity,, and united into a single polity bounded to the west by the Don river and to the east by the Don river. By the end of the 5th century BCE, groups of the Sauromatians had moved to the west and settled around Lake Maeotis along the Royal Scythians and the Maeotians.

The Sauromatians maintained peaceful relations with their western neighbours, the Scythians, who were also an Iranic equestrian nomadic people, with a long road starting in Scythia and continuing towards the eastern regions of Asia existing thanks to these friendly relations.

When the Persian Achaemenid king Darius I attacked the Scythians in 513 BCE, the Sauromatian king Scopasis supported the Scythians.

The Samara-Ural group
The Samara-Ural group of the Sauromatian culture has not yet been identified with any population recorded by ancient authors.

Characteristics
Sites belonging to the Sauromatian culture consist of kurgans whose contents are poorer than those of Scythian burials, attesting of the presence of less extensive class stratification among the Sauromatians as compared to their western Scythian neighbours.

The Sauromatian kurgans of the 5th century BCE found in the southern foothills of the Ural Mountains were, however, more developed, large and rich, and belonged to a military aristocracy. One example of such rich Sauromatian sites is the Pyatimary group, located on the Ilek river.

The Sauromatian kurgans of the Volga area were instead all poorer, and none of them possessed the stature and richness of the Ural kurgans. This is an attestation of the clan structure of Sauromatian society subsisting for longer in the region between the Don and the Volga, while the tribal aristocracy in this area was weaker in both economic and military terms as compared to the aristocracy near the Urals.

Out of all military Sauromatian burials which contain weapons, twenty percent of the graves belong to women warriors, attesting of the veracity of Graeco-Roman authors' claims that Sauromatian women held a special role and participated in military operations and in social life. Women's burials occupied the central position and were the richest in multiple Sauromatian funerary complexes, and sacrificial altars made of stone have been found in female graves.

Demise
The Lower Volga Group of the Sauromatian culture came to an end when, in the 4th to 3rd centuries BCE, they were conquered by nomadic Central Asian populations from the Ural foothills region regions east of the Urals who moved into the lower Volga region and the trans-Ural steppes.

The Sauromatians joined these new conquerors and were initially able to preserve their separate identity, although their name, modified into "Sarmatians" eventually came to be applied to the whole of the new people formed out of these migrations, whose constituent tribes were the Aorsi, Roxolani, Alans, and the Iazyges. Despite the Sarmatians having a similar name to the Sauromatians, ancient authors distinguished between the two, and Sarmatian culture did not directly develop from the Sauromatian culture; the core of the Sarmatians was instead composed of the newly arrived migrants from the southern Ural foothills.

References

Bibliography

 

 
Historical Iranian peoples
Peoples of the Caucasus
Ancient Russia
Ancient peoples of Russia
Nomadic groups in Eurasia
Iranian nomads
History of the western steppe
History of Eastern Europe
Tribes in Greco-Roman historiography
History of Ural
Archaeological cultures of Asia
Archaeological cultures of Eastern Europe
Archaeological cultures of Southeastern Europe